Carex laevigata, the smooth-stalked sedge, is a species of sedge. It lives in moist, shady environment in the lowlands of Western and Central Europe, particularly in alder–ash woodland. It is distinguished from similar species, such as C. binervis and C. distans by the presence of tiny red dots on the utricles. Carex laevigata was first described by James Edward Smith in 1800, in a paper in the journal Transactions of the Linnean Society of London.

References

External links

laevigata
Flora of Europe
Plants described in 1800
Taxa named by James Edward Smith